Warden is the title given to or adopted by the heads of some university college and other institutions. It dates back at least to the 13th century at Merton College, Oxford; the original Latin version is custos.

England
University of Bristol:
 Wills Hall (to 2018)

University of Cambridge:
 Robinson College

University of London:
 Goldsmiths

University of Oxford:
 All Souls College
 Keble College
 Merton College
 New College
 Nuffield College
 Rhodes House
 St Antony's College
 Wadham College
 Defunct colleges:
 Canterbury College
 Durham College
 Greyfriars 

University of Durham – vice-chancellor and warden
 Cranmer Hall; a theological college that forms part of St John's College, Durham

University of Manchester:
 Ashburne Hall
 St. Anselm Hall
 Hulme Hall

Winchester College

Radley College (unusually, the Warden here is the head master rather than the Chairman of the Council)

Australia
Residential colleges at Australian Universities adopt a variety of titles for their heads. Those colleges established by the Anglican Church use the title Warden more commonly, but it is also adopted by colleges established by other denominations and those with no religious affiliation.

Australian National University:
 Burton & Garran Hall
University of Melbourne:
 Trinity College
University of Newcastle:
 Newcastle University College
University of Queensland:
 St John's College
University of Sydney:
 St Paul's College
University of Western Australia:
 St George's College
Wollaston College

In literature
Examples of holders of this office in fiction occur in the following works; the name of the fictional institution is also given:

See also 
 Chancellor (education)
 Master (college)
 Principal (university)
 Provost (education)
 Rector (academia)

References 

Terminology of the University of Oxford
Terminology of the University of Cambridge
Academic administrators
Education and training occupations